was the 3rd daimyō of Hirado Domain in Hizen Province, Kyūshū, Japan. He was also the 28th hereditary head of the Matsura clan.

Takanobu was the eldest son of Matsura Hisanobu, 2nd daimyo of the domain, and Sono. When his father died suddenly at the age of 32, he became lord of the domain at the age of 12, under the guardianship of his grandfather.

Foreign trade was important to the domain, and Takanobu sought exchanges with Dutch and English merchants.

Takanobu had the Dharma name ) and was also baptised.

Notes 

Matsura clan
Tozama daimyo
1592 births
1637 deaths